Kelsey Christine Plum (born August 24, 1994) is an American professional basketball player for the Las Vegas Aces of the Women's National Basketball Association (WNBA). She won a WNBA championship in 2022, when she earned her first All-WNBA First Team selection and was named the WNBA All-Star Game Most Valuable Player (MVP) in her first WNBA All-Star Game. She also won the gold medal in Women's 3x3 basketball at the 2020 Summer Olympics.

She completed her high school education at La Jolla Country Day School in San Diego. Plum attended and played college basketball for the University of Washington. On February 25, 2017, Plum scored a career-high 57 points on senior night – making 19 of the 28 shots she took – to break the NCAA Division I women's basketball all-time scoring record with 3,397 points. On March 20, 2017, Plum broke the NCAA record for points in a single season with 1,080. She was selected out of UW with the first overall pick in the 2017 WNBA Draft by the San Antonio Stars. She was named the WNBA Sixth Player of the Year in 2021.

Early life
Plum is the daughter of Katie and Jim Plum. Her mother was an accomplished volleyball player for the University of California, Davis.  Her father earned All-American honors playing high school football in La Mesa, California, and went on to play football and baseball collegiately at San Diego State. Plum has two older sisters and a younger brother. Her sisters both followed in their mother's footsteps and played volleyball. Her oldest sister Kaitlyn played for UC Davis, while Lauren played for the University of Oregon and for USA Volleyball's Junior National Team. Her younger brother Daniel played football at UC Davis.  Kelsey played volleyball at first, excelling in the USA Volleyball junior system, but when it came time for high school, she chose La Jolla Country Day School over Poway High School, where her sisters had attended, and Plum chose basketball over volleyball. La Jolla Country Day School is where Candice Wiggins played during her high school years.

High school career
During the course of her high school career, Plum scored a total of 2,247 points, averaging 19.9 points per game. She recorded 677 rebounds, assisted on 381 baskets, and had 370 steals. Over her four years, her team had a record of 103–22, which led to four section titles and the 2012 CIF Division IV state championship. Plum also played AAU basketball for San Diego Sol. 

Plum was selected to the 2013 WBCA High School Coaches' All-America Team. She participated in the 2013 WBCA High School All-America Game, hitting six of her eight field goal attempts, scoring 14 points.

When it came time for college choices, Plum considered Maryland and Virginia on the east coast, and Cal, Gonzaga, Oregon and Washington on the west coast, then decided to accept the offer from Washington.

Plum was named a McDonald's All-American. This qualified her to participate in the 2013 McDonald's All-American Girls Game She was named Ms. Basketball by CalHiSports, an honor bestowed upon the best female high school basketball player in California. Prior winners include Kaleena Mosqueda-Lewis, Courtney Paris, Candice Wiggins, and Diana Taurasi.

USA Basketball

U19 team 2013
Plum was named to the USA Basketball U19 team, coached by Katie Meier, the head coach of the University of Miami. Among Plum's teammates were Moriah Jefferson and Breanna Stewart. Plum competed on behalf of the US at the Tenth FIBA U19 World Championship, held in Klaipeda and Panevežys, Lithuania, in July 2013.  The team won all nine games, with a winning margin averaging 43 points per game. Plum scored 5.6 points per game.

Pan American team 2015
Plum was injured in December, but cleared to continue playing through the season. After the season she underwent surgery on April 6. Her original dates for clearance to play extended beyond the Pan Am team trial date, but her rehabilitation went well, and she was cleared to return to the court two days before the Pan Am team trials. She has been named a member of the twelve player squad representing the US to play Basketball at the 2015 Pan American Games in Toronto which will be held from July 16 to 25 at the Ryerson Athletic Centre.

Plum was a member of the USA Women's Pan American Team which participated in basketball at the 2015 Pan American Games held in Toronto, Ontario, Canada July 10 to 26, 2015. The USA opened preliminary play with a game against Brazil. Although they opened up a 16-point lead in the second quarter Brazil came back, going on a 14–0 run to take a two-point lead in the third quarter. The USA responded with an 11–2 run with foul shot contributions by Jefferson and a three-point basket from Stewart. The USA ended up winning the close game 75–69.

The second game was against the Dominican Republic. USA scored the first eight points and was never threatened. USA won 94–55. Plum led the team with five assists. The final preliminary game USA played Puerto Rico. USA led by only three points at the end of the third quarter, largely due to the play of Carla Cortijo who scored 24 points, but left with an injury late in the game. After the injury the US extended the lead to 18 points and ended up with a 93–77 win, good for first place in their group.

In the semifinal game, Cuba led the US by as many as 14 points in the third quarter. The USA battled back and took a late lead. With under eight seconds to go, the USA was down by one point while Cuba had the ball. Linnae Harper stole the ball and made two free throws to give the USA the lead. Cuba missed its final shot to give the USA the win 65–64, propelling them into the gold-medal game against Canada.

The gold-medal game matched up the host team Canada against USA. After trading baskets early, the US edged out to a double-digit lead in the second quarter. However the Canadians fought back and tied up the game at halftime. In the third quarter, Canada outscored the US 26–15. The lead would reach as high as 18 points. The USA would fight back, but not all the way and Canada won the game and the gold-medal 81–73.

College career

Freshman year
After Plum helped the USA basketball team to win the gold medal in Lithuania, she flew directly to Seattle rather than heading home to San Diego and then going up to school. She was working out in the gym on the same day she left Lithuania. By heading directly to school it enabled her to sign up for summer school classes and get acquainted with the university and her teammates before the fall quarter began. Her head coach Mike Neighbors noticed her desire to get started, which helped him with his decision to name her the team captain before the season started, a rare event for a freshman. During her freshman year, she set six Washington freshman records. Her total points scored (695) were the most ever by a freshman, and her single game high of 38 points is a freshman record. She earned freshman of the year honors for the Pac-12 conference. She averaged almost 21 points per game during the regular season.

One of the highlights of the year was a victory over the fourth ranked team in the country, Stanford. Plum was the high scorer with 23 points.

Sophomore year
Washington opened their regular-season with a game against Oklahoma. Washington lost the game 90–80 but Plum set a new school record with 45 points. In her sophomore year, she was named to the "Wade Watch" a list of 25 players who are viewed as having the potential to win player of the year honors. She was also named to the list of 30 players to be considered for the Wooden Award. Plum helped the Washington Huskies earn a bid to the NCAA Tournament.In a coincidence, they faced Miami, coached by Katie Meier, who had been Plum's coach while on the USA Basketball U19 team. Plum scored 17 points in the game, but Miami prevailed 86–80.

Junior year
For the week of January 11–17, Plum was named both the Ann Meyers Drysdale National Player of the Week and the Pac-12 Player of the Week. By scoring 25.9 points per game, she ranked first in the Pac-12 and fourth in the nation. Plum also led the Huskies on an improbable NCAA Tournament run, highlighted by their first Final Four appearance in program history. Unfortunately, the magical run ultimately ended in the Final Four as Plum and the Huskies lost to a deeper, more talented Syracuse Orange team (who also clinched their first Final Four berth in program history), 80–59. The Orange would go on to lose to the undefeated 37–0 and three-time defending women's national champions Connecticut Huskies, 82–51.

Senior year
During Plum's senior season, she became the all-time leading scorer for either gender in Pac-12 history, passing the former record of Stanford's Chiney Ogwumike in a December 11, 2016 win over Boise State. The following month, during a win over Arizona, Plum became the first Pac-12 player, and the 12th NCAA Division I women's player, to reach 3,000 career points. On February 25, 2017, in the Huskies’ final regular season game, Plum scored a Pac-12 record 57 points in an 84–77 win over Utah. The record-setting output also gave Plum the NCAA Division I women's basketball career scoring record. She entered the game trailing Jackie Stiles’ previous record of 3,393 points by 53 points and broke the record in the fourth quarter. Plum led her Washington Huskies to a 29–6 record during her senior season, which boasted a record of 15–3 in the Pac-12. Plum, along with her third seeded Washington Huskies, made it to the regional semifinals of the NCAA tournament where they were knocked out by two seed Mississippi State.

According to ESPN.com, Plum was unanimously selected as an Associated Press All-American First Teamer, an honor only given to five players in women’s college basketball. Plum averaged 31.7 points while shooting 53 percent from the floor and 43 percent from three-point range during her senior campaign. Plum ended her senior season with a total of 1,109 points scored, an NCAA women’s basketball single season record. According to Excelle Sports, Plum broke the NCAA career free throw record, tallying 912 points from the free throw line throughout her illustrious career. Plum has also been named one of the five finalists for the Wooden Award, an award handed out to the best player in women’s college basketball, in the eyes of 250 sportscasters and writers. Plum was also named the AP player of the year for women’s college basketball, the first ever Washington Husky to earn the award. Other accolades Plum accumulated during her senior year include being a part of the all-Pac-12 team as well as winning the Pac-12 player of the year award, only the second husky ever to win the award, according to The Seattle Times’ website. Plum also earned the Nancy Lieberman award, an honor given to the top point guard in women's college basketball, as well as the Dawn Staley award, handed out to the best guard in women's college basketball. Plum ended her outstanding career with a point total of 3,527 and an assist total of 519. She finished just 270 points shy of Pete Maravich's all-time scoring record regardless of gender. Plum graduated from Washington in June 2017 with a bachelor's degree in anthropology.

College statistics

Professional career

WNBA

Plum was selected as the first pick of the 2017 WNBA draft by the San Antonio Stars. This  marked the first time in history that the first overall pick from the NBA (Markelle Fultz) and the WNBA came from the same school (University of Washington) in the same year. Plum made her career debut on May 25, 2017, against the Dallas Wings, she scored four points along with one assist off the bench in a 94–82 loss. On August 5, 2017, Plum scored a career-high 23 points in an 87–80 overtime win against the Seattle Storm. By the end of the season, Plum averaged 8.5 ppg and was voted on the All-Rookie Team, but the Stars finished with the second worst record in the league.

In 2018, the San Antonio Stars relocated to Las Vegas, Nevada and was renamed the Las Vegas Aces. In the 2018 season, Plum improved in every statistical category, averaging more points, rebounds and assists with higher shooting percentages. This helped the Aces improve overall from last season but fell short of playoff spot as they finished ninth place with a 14–20 record (6 wins better than last season).

In 2019, the Aces would finish the season as the number four seed with a 21–13 record, making the playoffs for the first time since 2014. They would receive a bye to the second round. In the playoffs, Plum would step up on the offensive end, averaging double-digits in ppg for the entire Aces playoff run. In the second round elimination game, the Aces defeated the Chicago Sky 93-92 off a desperation half-court game winner by teammate Dearica Hamby who came up with a steal on defence in the final 10 seconds of the game. In the semi-finals, the Aces would lose in four games to the Washington Mystics, who ended up winning the championship.

On May 15, 2020, Plum signed a two-year extension with the Aces worth $350K.  In early June, 2020, she suffered an injury to her Achilles tendon. Due to the injury and the surgery to repair it, she missed the 2020 season. Without Plum, the Aces were 18–4 in the shortened 22-game season with the number 1 seed. They would advance all the way to the Finals but fell short by losing to the Seattle Storm in a three-game sweep.

In 2021, Plum came off the bench and had a career year averaging 14.8 points, 3.6 assists, 2.5 rebounds, and 1.0 steals on 38.6% from the three and 94.4% from the free throw line. Plum ended the month of September averaging 21.7 points, 3.2 assists, and 1.5 steals, and was named Western Conference Player of the Month. Plum was finally healthy and had a career revamp season coming off the bench winning the WNBA Sixth Player of the Year and finished second in the WNBA Most Improved Player voting.

In 2022, Plum in a now starting role averaged a new career high in points, assist, and rebounds. 20.2 points, 5.1 assists, and 2.7 rebounds on 42% from three and 46% from the field. On June 22, Plum was announced to her first All-Star team as well as being voted a starter for the All Star Game. She then signed a two year contract extension with Las Vegas worth $185k for one year and $200k the other year. On July 10, Plum won All Star MVP with a 30 point performance. She grabbed Western Conference Player of the week two times for the weeks of May 30th-June 5th and July 28th-July 31st.Plum would go on to help the Aces to their second finals appearance and win their first championship in franchise history.

Overseas

Fenerbahçe

In the 2017-18 off-season, Plum signed with Fenerbahçe. During her first stint with the team, Plum would help the team win the Turkish Super League championship title. In the 2018-19 off-season, Plum returned with Fenerbahçe for a second stint, helping the team win another Turkish League championship and a Turkish Cup.

Galatasaray
On 15 January 2022, she signed a six month contract with Galatasaray.

Broadcasting
Plum's first work as a broadcaster came on January 17, 2020, when she was the analyst for Pac-12 Network's broadcast of the Arizona State at University of Washington women's basketball game.

WNBA career statistics

Regular season

|-
| align="left" | 2017
| align="left" | San Antonio
| 31 || 23 || 22.9 || .346 || .365 || .870 || 1.9 || 3.4 || 0.5 || 0.1 || 2.5 || 8.5
|-
| align="left" | 2018
| align="left" | Las Vegas
| 31 || 27 || 25.5 || .467 || .439 || .875 || 2.4 || 4.0 || 0.8 || 0.1 || 1.2 || 9.5
|-
| align="left" | 2019
| align="left" | Las Vegas
| 34 || 30 || 25.5 || .365 || .357 || .872 || 2.8 || 3.0 || 0.8 || 0.1 || 1.5 || 8.6
|-
| align="left" | 2021
| align="left" | Las Vegas
| 26 || 0 || 25.6 || .437 || .386 || .944 || 2.5 || 3.6 || 1.0 || 0.0 || 1.7 || 14.8
|-
|style="text-align:left;background:#afe6ba;"|  2022†
| align="left" | Las Vegas
| 36 || 36 || 32.8 || .460 || .420 || .839 || 2.7 || 5.1 || 1.0 || 0.1 || 2.6 || 20.2
|-
| align="left" | Career
| align="left" | 5 years, 1 team
| 158 || 115 || 26.7 || .421 || .399 || .876 || 2.5 || 3.9 || 0.8 || 0.1 || 1.9 || 12.4

Playoffs

|-
| align="left" | 2019
| align="left" | Las Vegas
| 5 || 3 || 35.0 || .492 || .529 || 1.000 || 4.8 || 7.8 || 0.2 || 0.0 || 3.0 || 15.2
|-
| align="left" | 2021
| align="left" | Las Vegas
| 5 || 0 || 28.8 || .471 || .387 || .909 || 2.0 || 3.4 || 1.0 || 0.0 || 2.4 || 19.6
|-
|style="text-align:left;background:#afe6ba;"|  2022†
| align="left" | Las Vegas
| 10 || 10 || 33.3 || .409 || .286 || .891 || 3.9 || 3.8 || 0.9 || 0.0 || 1.9 || 17.1
|-
| align="left" | Career
| align="left" | 3 years, 1 team
| 20 || 13 || 32.6 || .444 || .351 || .907 || 3.7 || 4.7 || 0.8 || 0.0 || 2.3 || 17.3

Awards and honors
 2013—CalHiSports Ms. Basketball
 2013—WBCA High School Coaches' All-America Team
 2013—McDonald's All-America team
 2016—WBCA NCAA Div. 1 All-America team
 2017—NCAA all-time women's basketball leading scorer
 2017—espnW national player of the year
 2017—unanimous pick on the espnW All-America first team
 2017—unanimous pick on the AP All-America first team
 2017—USBWA All-America team
 2017—AP women's basketball player of the year
 2017—Dawn Staley Award
 2017—The Ann Meyers Drysdale Award as USBWA national player of the year
 2017—Naismith Trophy
 2017—Nancy Lieberman Award
 2017—WBCA NCAA Div. 1 All-America team
 2017—Wade Trophy
 2017—John R. Wooden Award Women's Player of the Year
 2017—Honda Sports Award
 2022—WNBA All-Star Game MVP

Personal
On March 4, 2023, Plum married NFL tight end Darren Waller.

Footnotes

References

External links

Washington Huskies bio
USA Basketball profile

1994 births
Living people
3x3 basketball players at the 2020 Summer Olympics
All-American college women's basketball players
American expatriate basketball people in Turkey
American women's basketball players
American women's 3x3 basketball players
Arkansas Razorbacks women's basketball coaches
Basketball players at the 2015 Pan American Games
Basketball players from California
Fenerbahçe women's basketball players
Las Vegas Aces players
McDonald's High School All-Americans
Medalists at the 2015 Pan American Games
Medalists at the 2020 Summer Olympics
Olympic 3x3 basketball players of the United States
Olympic gold medalists for the United States in 3x3 basketball
Pan American Games medalists in basketball
Pan American Games silver medalists for the United States
Parade High School All-Americans (girls' basketball)
People from Poway, California
Point guards
San Antonio Stars draft picks
San Antonio Stars players
Sportspeople from San Diego County, California
Washington Huskies women's basketball players
Women's National Basketball Association All-Stars
Women's National Basketball Association first-overall draft picks
Galatasaray S.K. (women's basketball) players